Sebastián Pablo Cobelli Larese (Born 20 January 1978 in Rosario) is an Argentine football striker.

Career
Sebastián Cobelli made his debut for Newell's Old Boys on November 28, 1996 in a match against Tiro Federal in Argentina. He played 68 times for Newell's before joining Genoa of Italy.

After short stints with Chamois Niortais F.C. of France and Chongqing Lifan of China he returned to Argentina to play for 2nd division side Belgrano and then Huracán.

Between 2005 and 2008 he played in Greece for Panachaiki, Colombia for Deportivo Pereira and in Chile for Antofagasta and Santiago Morning.

In 2008, he returned to Córdoba to join Talleres.

External links
 BDFA profile
 Sebastián Cobelli on Soccerway

1978 births
Living people
Footballers from Rosario, Santa Fe
Argentine people of Italian descent
Argentine footballers
Argentine expatriate footballers
Association football forwards
Argentine Primera División players
Categoría Primera A players
Newell's Old Boys footballers
FC Nantes players
FC Luzern players
Chamois Niortais F.C. players
Chongqing Liangjiang Athletic F.C. players
Club Atlético Belgrano footballers
Club Atlético Huracán footballers
Talleres de Córdoba footballers
Genoa C.F.C. players
Santiago Morning footballers
Expatriate footballers in Switzerland
Argentine expatriate sportspeople in Switzerland
Expatriate footballers in France
Argentine expatriate sportspeople in France
Expatriate footballers in Greece
Argentine expatriate sportspeople in Greece
Argentine expatriate sportspeople in Colombia
Expatriate footballers in Colombia
Argentine expatriate sportspeople in China
Expatriate footballers in China
Expatriate footballers in Chile
Argentine expatriate sportspeople in Chile
Expatriate footballers in Italy
Argentine expatriate sportspeople in Italy
Expatriate footballers in Peru
Argentine expatriate sportspeople in Peru